was a town located in Maniwa District, Okayama Prefecture, Japan.

As of 2003, the town had an estimated population of 15,652 and a density of 105.81 persons per km2. The total area was 147.92 km2.

On March 31, 2005, Ochiai, along with the town of Hokubō (from Jōbō District), and towns of Katsuyama, Kuse and Yubara, and the villages of Chūka, Kawakami, Mikamo and Yatsuka (all from Maniwa District) were merged to create the city of Maniwa.

Geography
Rivers: Asahi River (The big-3 river through Okayama Prefecture), Bicchū River (Tributary of the Asahi River)

Adjoining municipalities
Okayama Prefecture
Katsuyama
Kuse
Hokubō
Takahashi (Former Ukan town)
Tsuyama (Former Kume town)
Misaki (Former Asahi town)
Kibichūō (Former Kamogawa town)

Education
Amatsu Elementary School
Ueda Elementary School
Ueyama Branch School
Ochiai Elementary School
Kawahigashi Elementary School
Kiyama Elementary School
Hinoue Branch School
Kōchi Elementary School
Tsuda Elementary School
Bessho Elementary School
Mikawa Elementary School
Ochiai Junior High School
Okayama Prefectural Ochiai High School

Transportation

Railways
West Japan Railway Company
Kishin Line
Mimasaka-Oiwake Station - Mimasaka-Ochiai Station - Komi Station

Road
Expressways:
Chūgoku Expressway
Mimasaka-Oiwake Parking Area - Ochiai Junction - Ochiai Interchange - Maniwa Parking Area
Yonago Expressway
Ochiai Junction
National highways:
Route 181
Route 313
Prefectural roads:
Okayama Prefectural Route 30 (Ochiai-Takebe)
Okayama Prefectural Route 66 (Ochiai-Kamogawa)
Okayama Prefectural Route 84 (Katsuyama-Kurihara)
Okayama Prefectural Route 204 (Mimasaka-Ochiai Station)
Okayama Prefectural Route 329 (Nishibara-Kuse)
Okayama Prefectural Route 330 (Meki-Ōba)
Okayama Prefectural Route 332 (Kurihara-Ukan)
Okayama Prefectural Route 333 (Ueyama-Dando)
Okayama Prefectural Route 370 (Eyomi-Kamigōchi)
Okayama Prefectural Route 390 (Komi-Tsukida Station)
Okayama Prefectural Route 411 (Tarumi-Oiwake)
Roadside Station
Daigo no Sato

Notable places and events

A 1000+ year old cherry tree, named after the former Emperor Daigo, who commented upon the impressiveness of the tree when passing by on his way to exile in the Oki Islands.

External links
Official website of Maniwa in Japanese
Maniwa city Ochiai area digital museum in Japanese

Dissolved municipalities of Okayama Prefecture
Maniwa